Silver Jubilee National Service of Thanksgiving may refer to:

 The service of thanksgiving held at St Paul's Cathedral to mark the Silver Jubilee of George V in 1935
 The service of thanksgiving held at St Paul's Cathedral to mark the Silver Jubilee of Elizabeth II in 1977